The 1999 Wisconsin Badgers football team represented the University of Wisconsin in the 1999 NCAA Division I-A football season.

Season
Wisconsin finished the regular season 9–2 overall (7–1 conference) and were sole champions of the Big Ten Conference for the first time since 1962 (the 1993 and 1998 championships were shared).  They defeated #22 Stanford 17–9 in the 2000 Rose Bowl for the third Rose Bowl victory of coach Barry Alvarez's tenure (and program history) to finish the season 10–2.

Ron Dayne

Ron Dayne gained 1,834 rushing yards as a senior.  Dayne broke the NCAA Division I-A (now known as NCAA Division I FBS) career rushing record in the final game of the 1999 season against Iowa.  Dayne ended his career with 6,397 rushing yards, eclipsing the record set the previous year by Ricky Williams of Texas.

Dayne rushed for 200 yards or more in a game a dozen times, including his final game, a 17–9 victory over Stanford in the Rose Bowl. Dayne had 200 yards on 34 carries and was named the Rose Bowl's Most Valuable Player for the second consecutive year. He became one of only three (now, four) players to win two Rose Bowl MVPs (Washington's Bob Schloredt, Southern California's Charles White, and Texas' Vince Young are the others).

Dayne won the Heisman Trophy, the second player in Wisconsin's history to receive this award, after Alan Ameche in 1954.  He also received many other awards in this season and throughout his college career, including Big Ten Conference Player of the Year, and All-American placement. Dayne's career rushing total remains an NCAA record.  Bowl games included, he amassed 7,125 yards, becoming the first player in NCAA history to total over 7,000 rushing yards.  He is one of five players in NCAA history to rush for over a thousand yards in each of his four seasons.

Individual awards and honors
Brooks Bollinger, Big Ten Freshman of the Year
Ron Dayne, All-America selection
Ron Dayne, Doak Walker Award
Ron Dayne, Heisman Trophy 
Ron Dayne, Maxwell Award
Ron Dayne, Walter Camp Award  
Ron Dayne, Rose Bowl Most Valuable Player

Schedule

Rankings

Roster

Regular starters

Game summaries

at Ohio State

Source: USA Today

Team players in the NFL

References

Wisconsin
Wisconsin Badgers football seasons
Big Ten Conference football champion seasons
Rose Bowl champion seasons
Wisconsin Badgers football